HMS Orlando was the lead ship of the  of first-class cruisers built in the yards of Palmers Shipbuilding and Iron Company, Jarrow and launched on 3 August 1886.

Service history
She was commanded by Charles Ramsay Arbuthnot on the Australia Station from 1892 to 1895. In 1899 she was assigned to the China Station, Captain James Henry Thomas Burke in command. During the Boxer Rebellion in 1900, sailors from HMS Orlando formed part of the force led by Vice-Admiral Sir Edward Seymour attempting to relieve the British Legation in Beijing. A replica of a bell captured from the Taku Forts forms part of a memorial to HMS Orlando in Victoria Park, Portsmouth.

In late March 1902 she left Hong Kong for Singapore, arriving there on 6 April. After three weeks, she left Penang in late April, homebound, stopping at Colombo on 5 May, Aden on 14 May, Malta on 28 May, and Gibraltar on 2 June, before arriving at Portsmouth four days later. Captain Burke died at sea on 12 May 1902, during the journey, and was buried at Aden. Commander Philip Howard Colomb was in charge for the remainder of the journey. She paid off at Portsmouth on 25 July, and was placed in the B Division of the Fleet Reserve.

HMS Orlando was sold for scrapping on 11 July 1905 to Thos. W. Ward of Morecambe for £10,000.

Notes

References
Bastock, John (1988), Ships on the Australia Station, Child & Associates Publishing Pty Ltd; Frenchs Forest, Australia.

External links

 https://web.archive.org/web/20071016215141/http://memorials.inportsmouth.co.uk/city-centre/orlando.htm
 http://www.battleships-cruisers.co.uk/hms_orlando.htm

 

Orlando-class cruisers
Ships built on the River Tyne
1886 ships